Nahcotta is an unincorporated community in Pacific County, in the American state of Washington. It is located on Willapa Bay, on the eastern coast of the Long Beach Peninsula, within the Ocean Park CDP.

History
 
Nahcotta was first settled in 1890 by J.A. Morehead and named for Nahcati, the chief of a local Chinook tribe. Nahcotta was once the northern terminal of the Ilwaco Railway and Navigation Company, a narrow gauge railroad which ran from Ilwaco, and later from Megler, in southwestern Pacific County, up the Long Beach Peninsula to Nahcotta and back, once a day.  The railroad was in operation from 1889 to 1930.

The community had a small contract post office that opened in 1889 and was maintained by a pair of local residents out of a small building. The post office was closed on February 27, 2021, after a request from the operators for additional funds was denied by the United States Postal Service.

See also
Steamboats of Willapa Bay

References

Further reading
Greene, Trecia R.; Portrait of Peninsula Woman; Lincoln, Nebraska: iUniverse, Inc., 2006. Portraits of Nahcotta women published in the Long Beach Peninsula's Chinook Observer between September 2001 and June 2005.

External links
Passenger train departing from Nahcotta dock, 1910
Razor clam cannery, 1916
Oyster beds in Willapa Bay, circa 1900
Oystering in Willapa Bay circa 1940

Unincorporated communities in Pacific County, Washington
Ilwaco Railway stations